Arastun Ispandi oghlu Mahmudov (23 February 1957, Ismailly, Azerbaijan SSR – 28 January 1992, Shusha, Azerbaijan) was the National Hero of Azerbaijan and warrior during the First Nagorno-Karabakh War.

Early life and education 
Mahmudov was born on 23 February 1957 in Pirabilqasim village of İsmailly raion of Azerbaijan SSR. He moved to Baku with his family. In 1970, he completed his secondary education at the Secondary School No. 220 in Baku. In 1975 he entered the Civil Aviation School in Leningrad Oblast.

Family 
Mahmudov was married and had three children.

First Nagorno-Karabakh War 
On 28 January 1992, the Azerbaijani transport helicopter Mil Mi-8 operated by Mahmudov was reportedly shot down by Armenians near the town of Shusha. As a result of shot down, Mahmudov was tragically killed together with the whole crew.

Honors 
Arastun Ispandi oghlu Mahmudov was posthumously awarded the title of the "National Hero of Azerbaijan" by Presidential Decree No. 337 dated 25 November 1992. 
 
He was buried at a Martyrs' Lane cemetery in Baku. The secondary school No. 220 where he studied was named after him. In 2018, a documentary titled Battles in heaven was released. The documentary looks into memorials surrounding the lives and battlefields of Arastun Mahmudov.

See also 
 First Nagorno-Karabakh War
 List of National Heroes of Azerbaijan
 Azerbaijani Air and Air Defence Force
 1992 Azerbaijani Mil Mi-8 shootdown

References

Sources 
Vüqar Əsgərov. "Azərbaycanın Milli Qəhrəmanları" (Yenidən işlənmiş II nəşr). Bakı: "Dərələyəz-M", 2010, səh. 179.

1957 births
1992 deaths
Azerbaijani military personnel
Azerbaijani military personnel of the Nagorno-Karabakh War
Azerbaijani military personnel killed in action
National Heroes of Azerbaijan
People from Ismailli District